Alistair Cook may refer to:
 Alastair Cook, English cricketer
 Ali Cook, real name Alistair Cook, magician and actor
 Alistair Cooke (1908–2004), journalist and broadcaster
 Alistair Cooke, Baron Lexden, British historian, author and politician